Central Chiangmai Airport, previously known as CentralPlaza Chiang Mai Airport and Central Airport Plaza, is a shopping mall in Mueang District, Chiang Mai. The shopping malls was established as Tantraphan Airport Plaza in 1987. Central Pattana took over and re-branded the shopping mall to Central Airport Plaza in March 1996. In early 2022, CentralPlaza Chiang Mai Airport underwent a minor name change and is now known as Central Chiang Mai Airport, which is part of Central Pattana's efforts to simplify the Central brand across Thailand.

Anchors 
Central Chiangmai Airport The shopping mall has five floors.
 Robinson Department Store
 Tops
 Major Cineplex 7 Cinemas
 Baan & Beyond (BnB Home)
 Go! Wow
 Officemate
 B2S
 Supersports
 Power Buy
 Food Park
 Chiangmai Hall

See also
 List of shopping malls in Thailand

Notes

References 
 
 

Shopping malls in Thailand
Buildings and structures in Chiang Mai province
Central Pattana
Shopping malls established in 1987
1987 establishments in Thailand